Anna Kristina Kappelin (born 13 April 1958) is a Swedish journalist and author residing in Rome, Italy. She is a foreign correspondent in Italy for SVT, and writes columns for Dagens Industri and Sydsvenska Dagbladet. She reports mainly for politics and sports in Italy. Kappelin has a Bachelor of Arts completed in film and theater history, sociology and culture communication at Lunds University. She also studied journalism at Journalisthögskolan in Gothenburg and Johns Hopkins School of Advanced International Studies in Bologna. She has had several books published in Italy.

Bibliography 
1994 – Italien inifrån: familjen, makten och hela härligheten
2000 – Sverige och Italien = Svezia e Italia
2007 – Rom: maten, människorna, livet
2010 – Berlusconi – italienaren
2014 – Italiensk dagbok

References

External links 

1958 births
20th-century Swedish journalists
Journalists from Stockholm
Living people
20th-century Swedish women writers